Zhaleh-ye Kuseh (also Romanized as Zhāleh-ye Kūseh and Žāle-ye Kūse) is a village in Ozgoleh Rural District, Ozgoleh District, Salas-e Babajani County, Kermanshah Province, Iran. At the 2006 census, its population was 63, in 15 families.

References 

Populated places in Salas-e Babajani County